Decimus Storry Govett (1827 – 30 August 1912) was an Anglican priest in the last decades of the 19th century and the first two of the 20th.

He was born in 1827 and educated at Wadham College, Oxford. After ordination he held curacies at Ashford, Staines and Frampton Cotterell and was then a chaplain at Antibes, Nice and Marseilles; after which he became archdeacon, then Dean of Gibraltar. He died on 30 August 1912.

Notes

1827 births
Archdeacons of Gibraltar
Alumni of Wadham College, Oxford
Deans of Gibraltar
1912 deaths